Wesley is an unincorporated community in Atoka County, Oklahoma, United States. It is ten miles south of Kiowa.

A post office was established at Wesley, Indian Territory on October 2, 1903. It closed on May 15, 1955. At the time of its founding, Wesley was located in Atoka County, Choctaw Nation.

References

Unincorporated communities in Atoka County, Oklahoma
Unincorporated communities in Oklahoma